Connor Grey (born May 6, 1994) is an American professional baseball pitcher in the New York Mets organization.

Career

Arizona Diamondbacks
Grey graduated from Frewsburg High School in Frewsburg, New York, in 2012. He attended St. Bonaventure University, where he played college baseball for the St. Bonaventure Bonnies. Grey posted a 4.12 earned run average (ERA) over four seasons. He was drafted by the Arizona Diamondbacks in the 20th round of the 2016 MLB Draft. He made his professional debut on June 20, 2016, for the Missoula Osprey. Grey played in the Diamondbacks' minor-league system from 2016 to 2019. On May 28, 2020, during a season in which Grey did not play with the MiLB season cancelled due to the COVID-19 pandemic, the Diamondbacks released him, making him a free agent.

New York Mets
Grey began the 2021 season with the Chicago Dogs of the American Association of Professional Baseball, an independent baseball league, before being signed by the Mets to a minor-league contract on June 17, 2021. On August 22, 2022, Grey's contract was selected by the Mets and he was promoted to the active roster. He warmed up in a game against the New York Yankees, but did not enter. He was designated for assignment on September 1 without appearing in a major league game. 

On January 13, 2023, Grey re-signed with the Mets on a minor league deal.

References

External links

Living people
1994 births
People from Frewsburg, New York
Baseball players from New York (state)
Baseball pitchers
St. Bonaventure Bonnies baseball players
Missoula Osprey players
Hillsboro Hops players
Visalia Rawhide players
Reno Aces players
Kane County Cougars players
Jackson Generals (Southern League) players
Chicago Dogs players
Binghamton Rumble Ponies players
Brooklyn Cyclones players
Salt River Rafters players
Syracuse Mets players